Sikandar Kher (born 31 October 1981) is an Indian actor. He made his acting debut with the film, Woodstock Villa (2008). In the subsequent years, Kher went to be a part of multi-starrers such as Khelein Hum Jee Jaan Sey, Players, Aurangzeb, Tere Bin Laden: Dead or Alive and The Zoya Factor.

In 2020, he appeared in a pivotal role in the Indian crime drama series, Aarya. Kher has also been a part of Sense8, an American science fiction show in 2017.

Early life and education
Kher was born on 31 October, 1981 and is the son of actress and politician Kirron Kher and her first husband Gautam Berry. He is the stepson of actor Anupam Kher. He attended The Doon School in Dehradun. He then joined the short-term six-month theatre course at the National School of Drama.

Career
Kher got his first break in acting from producer Sanjay Gupta in the film, Woodstock Villa. The film's review by Hindustan Times said that his performance was limited by the film's screenplay and direction. On the other hand, Times of India said that he had a screen presence. CNN-IBN's Rajeev Masand, who was highly critical about the movie, said that Sikander had an "engaging presence and impressive dialogue delivery."

In the subsequent years, Kher went to be a part of multi-starrers such as Ashutosh Gowariker's Khelein Hum Jee Jaan Sey, Abbas-Mustan's thriller Players and Aurangzeb starring Rishi Kapoor and Arjun Kapoor, among others. He was hailed for his comic timing in films like Tere Bin Laden 2 and Sonam K Ahuja starrer The Zoya Factor. Appreciating his performance in the latter, Monika Rawal Kukreja from Hindustan Times, in her review of the film, wrote, “Sikander Kher as Zoya's brother Zorawar delivers some clever comic punches.”

In late 2021, he starred in an Akshay Kumar and Katrina Kaif starer action film, Sooryavanshi.

Kher is a member of the International Film and Television Club of Asian Academy Of Film & Television, Noida.

Personal life
In January 2016, Kher got engaged to Priya Singh, cousin of actress Sonam Kapoor. In March 2016, the engagement between Sikandar and Priya had been called off.

Filmography

Films

Television

References

External links

 

1981 births
Living people
Indian male film actors
Male actors in Hindi cinema
Male actors from Mumbai
The Doon School alumni